Talley is a village in Carmarthenshire, Wales.

Talley or Talleys may also refer to:

Arts and entertainment
 Talley & Son, a 1985 play by American playwright Lanford Wilson
 Talley's Folly, a 1979 play by American playwright Lanford Wilson
 The Talleys, an American musical group

Places
 Talley Abbey, Talley, Carmarthenshire, Wales
 Talley Lakes, Talley, Carmarthenshire, Wales

Other uses
 Talley (name)
 Talley v. California, 1960 case
 Talley's Group, a New Zealand agribusiness

See also 
 Tally (disambiguation)
 William Talley House (disambiguation), multiple houses